The Battle of Overloon was a battle fought in the Second World War battle between Allied forces and the German Army which took place in and around the village of Overloon in the south-east of the Netherlands between 30 September and 18 October 1944. The battle, which resulted in an Allied victory, ensued after the Allies launched Operation Aintree. The Allies went on to liberate the town of Venray.

Background
In September 1944, the Allies had launched Operation Market Garden, a major offensive from the Dutch-Belgian border across the south of the Netherlands through Eindhoven and Nijmegen toward the Rhine bridge at Arnhem, with the goal of crossing the Rhine and bypassing the Siegfried Line in preparation for the final drive toward Berlin. Allied airborne troops were defeated at the Rhine bridge in Arnhem and the advance stopped south of the Lower Rhine, resulting in a narrow salient that ran from the north of Belgium across the south-east of the Netherlands.

German forces attacked this salient from a bridgehead west of the bend in the river Meuse (known as Maas in Dutch and German) near the city of Venlo. The bridgehead was established by retreating German forces who were reinforced with troops arriving from nearby Germany by crossing the Meuse in Venlo. The western edge of this bridgehead ran through the Peel, a region with bogs and several canals blocking an Allied advance. The Allies decided to attack the bridgehead from the north, and this meant they had to capture Overloon and Venray, which were on the road toward Venlo.

Operation Aintree (named after Aintree racecourse) had the goal of securing the narrow salient the Allies had established between Eindhoven and Nijmegen during Operation Market Garden and destroying the German bridgehead west of the Meuse, in preparation for the eventual Allied advance into the nearby German Rhineland.

Battle
The battle of Overloon ensued as the Allies in Operation Aintree advanced from nearby positions south toward the village of Overloon. After a failed attack on Overloon by the U.S. 7th Armored Division, the British 3rd Infantry Division and the British 11th Armoured Division took over. The U.S. 7th Armored Division was moved south of Overloon to the Deurne – Weert area. Here they were attached to the British Second Army, and ordered to make demonstration attacks to the east in order to divert enemy forces from the Overloon and Venlo areas.

Suffering heavy losses the British captured Overloon and moved towards Venray. The advance on Venray resulted in heavy losses, especially around the Loobeek creek, which was swollen due to heavy autumn rains and was flooded and mined by the Germans. Casualties were heavy here among the 1st Battalion, Royal Norfolk Regiment which was serving in 185th Infantry Brigade of the British 3rd Division. During the battle, the village of Overloon was destroyed.In and around Overloon, some 2,500 soldiers died, making it one of the bloodiest battles in the Netherlands during the Second World War. Dozens of tanks, mainly American, were destroyed.

Aftermath
Despite the fact that both Overloon and eventually Venray were taken by the Allies, the advance toward the bend of the Meuse near Venlo was postponed. This was due to the number of casualties the Allies had sustained and because troops were needed to secure more essential targets: the Scheldt estuary, leading to the vital port of Antwerp and the west of the province of North Brabant, in between Antwerp and the salient that had been established. The offensive was eventually resumed, and by early December the German bridgehead west of the Meuse was destroyed. Blerick (near Venlo) was liberated in the first days of December 1944; Venlo and other districts east of the Meuse were liberated on 1 March 1945 (during Operation Grenade).

Remembrance
The battle of Overloon has become known as the second battle of Caen due to its ferocity and also as the forgotten battle, because like the other engagements in the Peel area it is not well known in much of the Netherlands.

The tanks and other armoured vehicles which were left on the battlefield have been preserved and in Overloon a museum, which opened in 1946, was erected to commemorate the battle. Today, two museums occupy the original museum grounds, which have been renamed Liberty Park. The National War and Resistance Museum of the Netherlands focuses on the Dutch experience of war and German occupation between 1940 and 1945. The Marshall Museum holds a collection of armoured vehicles, weaponry and aircraft from the Second World War, much of it left on the Overloon battlefield, and focuses on the battle of Overloon and other military aspects of the Second World War.

Two memorials have been erected on the battle site. On the banks of the Loobeek creek, where it is crossed by the road between Overloon and Venray, stands the Norfolk monument, dedicated to the 1st Battalion of the Royal Norfolk Regiment. The liberation of Venray is one of their battle honours. There is also another memorial in the museum grounds of Liberty Park. (see below).

The text of the memorial:
Dutch:
STA EEN OGENBLIK STIL bezoeker en bedenk dat de grond waarop gij nu vertoeft eens een van de felst omstreden sectoren was van het slagveld Overloon. Bitter is hier gevochten in man tegen man gevechten. Vele jonge levens ontkomen aan de slagvelden van Nettuno en Normandië vonden onder deze bomen hun einde.

English translation:
TAKE PAUSE FOR A MOMENT visitor, and consider that the ground you are now on was once one of the most fiercely contested sectors of the Overloon battlefield. Bitter hand-to-hand combat ensued here. Many young lives, having escaped from the battlefields of Nettuno and Normandy, met their ends under these trees.

See also
 Overloon War Museum
 Kenneth Mayhew

References

External links
 
 LandmarkScout - The Jackal, a churchill tank left behind in the forgotten Battle of Overloon
 LandmarkScout - Tank Driver Bob Dare recounts the fate of the Jackal in the Battle of Overloon

Overloon
Overloon
Overloon
Overloon
1944 in the Netherlands
September 1944 events
October 1944 events
Overloon
History of Land van Cuijk